Urla is a census town in Raipur District in the Indian state of Chhattisgarh.

Demographics
As of the 2001 Indian census, As of 2001, Urla had a population of 9359, with males constituting 55% of the population and females 45%. Urla has an average literacy rate of 55%, lower than the national average of 59.5%: male literacy is 66%, and female literacy is 41%. 22% of the population is under 6 years of age.

References

Cities and towns in Raipur district